Panopeus was a Greek town of ancient Phocis.

Panopeus may also refer to:
 Panopeus (mythology), in Greek mythology, a son of Phocus and father of Epeus.  He was friends with Amphitryon;
 Panopeus (father of Aegle), the father of Theseus's companion Aegle (mythology);
 Panopeus (genus), a genus of crabs;
 Panopea (bivalve), bivalve.